Ivica Ampov (full name: Ivica Panche Ampov) is the current Chief of the Macedonian Military Intelligence. He was born in Kratovo, Macedonia on 31 October 1969. He has held this position since 1 October 2009.

References

People from Kratovo, North Macedonia
1969 births
Living people